Grundlagen der Mathematik (English: Foundations of Mathematics) is a two-volume work by David Hilbert and Paul Bernays.  Originally published in 1934 and 1939, it presents fundamental mathematical ideas and introduced second-order arithmetic.

Publication history

1934/1939 (Vol. I, II) First German edition, Springer
1944 Reprint of first edition by J. W. Edwards, Ann Arbor, Michigan.
1968/1970 (Vol. I, II) Second revised German edition, Springer
1979/1982 (Vol. I, II) Russian translation of 1968/1970, Nauka Publ., Moscow
2001/2003 (Vol. I, II) French translation, L’Harmattan, Paris
2011/2013 (Parts A and B of Vol. I, prefaces and sections 1-5) English translation of 1968 and 1934, bilingual with German facsimile on the left-hand sides.
The Hilbert Bernays Project is producing an English translation.

See also
 Hilbert–Bernays paradox

References

External links
Hilbert Bernays Project which aims to produce an English translation of Grundlagen der Mathematik.

1934 non-fiction books
1939 non-fiction books
Mathematical logic
Mathematics books
Logic books